Verkehrsbetriebe Luzern (VBL) (Lucerne Transit Agency) is the main provider of public transport in the Swiss city of Lucerne. It operates some 92 buses and 74 trolleybuses on 25 daytime routes, as well as 5 overnight services (known as Nachstern) and one funicular service.

History
VBL dates back to December 1899, when a tramway was opened in the city, which at the time had a population of around 30,000. This tramway was completed in 1903, when it reached 11.3 km in length. Over the period 1909–1936, the tramway was extended to the Emmenbrücke and Kriens areas. The late 1920s and early 1930s saw the first bus services being introduced to the city. Initial proposals for a trolleybus system in 1938 were rejected by the citizens of Lucerne, however further proposals in 1941 were met with a far more positive response, and the first line was opened between Lucerne station and Allmend. Trolleybuses gradually replaced trams in the city, and the tramway was finally closed in 1961. The Lucerne trolleybus system was upgraded in 1965/66 with the introduction of 14 new articulated trolleybuses. The 1970s revolutionised the way tickets were bought on the bus and trolleybus networks, with most now being purchased from roadside vending machines. In the 1980s several motorbus lines were converted to trolleybuses. The fleet was upgraded in 1985 with the purchase of 54 new vehicles. A new fare system was introduced in 1991, with the network being divided into various zones. In the same year, VBL took delivery of 4 new articulated trolleybuses and 6 articulated motorbuses. The start of the 21st century brought with it a large intake of new vehicles, with both motorbuses and trolleybuses being delivered. VBL now boasts a very modern fleet, with the Mercedes-Benz Citaro comprising a large portion of the bus fleet.

Routes

Trolleybus routes

1 Obernau - Kriens - Luzern Bahnhof (Lucerne railway station) - Maihof - Ebikon Fildern
2 Emmenbrücke Sprengi - Emmenbrücke Central - Luzern Bahnhof
4 Hubelmatt - Luzern Bahnhof
5 Kriens Busschleife - Pilatusplatz - Emmenbrücke Bahnhof Süd
6 Matthof - Bundesplatz - Luzern Bahnhof - Luzernerhof - Brüelstrasse - Büttenenhalde
7 Biregghof - Bundesplatz - Luzern Bahnhof - Luzernerhof - Zwyssigplatz - Unterlöchli
8 Hirtenhof - Bundesplatz - Luzern Bahnhof - Luzernerhof - Brüelstrasse - Würzenbach

Bus routes
9 Bramberg - Luzern Bahnhof
10 Obergütsch - Luzern Bahnhof
11 Dattenberg - Eichhof - Luzern Bahnhof
12 Littau Gasshof - Luzern Bahnhof
14 Brüelstrasse - St. Anna - Luzern Bahnhof - Pilatusplatz - Eichhof - Grosshofstrasse - Nidfeld - Grabenhof - Pilatusmarkt - Horw Zentrum
15 Kriens - Zumhof/Senti/Bachstrasse/Bergstrasse/Sidhalde - Kriens
16 Kriens - Mattenhof - Kuonimatt - Pilatusmarkt - Horw Zentrum - Spitz
19 Friedental - Kantonsspittal - Scholssberg - Luzern Bahnhof
20 Ennethorw/Technikumstrasse - Horw Zentrum - Wegscheide]- Luzern Bahnhof
21 Kriens - Mattenhof - Pilatusmarkt - Horw Steinbach - Wegscheide - Kastanienbaum - St. Niklausen - Luzern Bahnhof
22 Gisikon - Perlen - Buchrain - Ebikon - Luzern Bahnhof
23 Gisikon Weitblick - Root - Dierekon - Ebikon - Luzern Bahnhof
24 Meggen Tschädigen - Lerchenbühl - Luzern Bahnhof
25 Meggen Gottlieben - Meggen Piuskirche - Brüelstrasse
26 Ottigenbühl - Ebikon Hofmatt - Unterlöchli - Adligenswil - Brüelstrasse
30 Littau Bahnhof - Ebikon Bahnhof
N1 Obernau - Kriens - Grosshofstrasse - Eichhof - Luzern Bahnhof - Maihof - Gisikon Weitblick
N2 Luzern Bahnhof - Emmenbrücke
N3 Luzern Bahnhof - Küssnacht - Vitznau
N4 Luzern Bahnhof - Hergiswil - Stans
N5 Luzern Bahnhof - Sarnen - Lungern
N6 Luzern Bahnhof - Wolhusen - Menznau
N9 Luzern Bahnhof - Inwil - Hochdorf - Ermensee
N12 Luzern Bahnhof - Littau Gasshof
N21 Luzern Bahnhof - Kastanienbaum - Horw

Funicular
The VBL operates the recently reopened Gütschbahn funicular.

Rolling stock
The bus fleet has been modernised over the past few years, with the introduction of both rigid and articulated Mercedes-Benz Citaro vehicles, which have been placed into service at various points since 1998.

Motor buses
The current motor bus fleet is as follows:
 38 Mercedes-Benz Citaro (1998–2006)
 31 Mercedes-Benz Citaro articulated (2002–2006)
 3 Volvo (1996)
 4 Mercedes-Benz O405N2 (1995–1997)
 2 Mercedes-Benz O405N (1993)
 2 Scania/Hess N94UB (2005)
 2 Volvo B10L (1996)
 1 Mercedes-Benz 416CDI (2002)
 1 Neoplan N4009 (1994)
 1 Neoplan N4411 (2001)

Trolleybuses

The trolleybus fleet has also been modernised in recent years, including the arrival of the company's first bi-articulated trolleybuses in 2006.  The non-articulated trolleybuses haul trailers (see next section) on some routes.

The current trolleybus fleet is as follows:
 29 NAW/Hess/Siemens BG5-25 (1988–1989)
 19 NAW/Hess/Siemens BG5-25 articulated (1987–1991)
 9 Hess/Vossloh Kiepe BGT-N2C articulated (2004–2006)
 3 Hess/Vossloh-Kiepe BGGT-N2C lighTram 3 double-articulated (2006)

Trailers
 16 Lanz & Marti/Hess APM 5.6-13 trailers (1998–2005)

Livery
VBL buses and trolleybuses are now painted in a livery which is mainly white, with blue finish. Previously, the livery was the reverse of this, being mainly blue.

See also
Auto AG Rothenburg

References

External links
Verkehrsbetriebe Luzern
Kriensnet - extensive collection of VBL photos

Bus companies of Switzerland
Public transport in Switzerland
Defunct railway companies of Switzerland
Defunct town tramway systems by city